Folk religious practices remain in the Bektashiyyah tariqa and certain practices are also found to a lesser extent in Balkan Christianity and non-Bektashi Balkan Islam as well, according to some Western Islamic scholars.

Rites, rituals, and holy things in the Balkan villages common to both to Muslims and Christians 

Famous archaeologist Arthur Evans, after studying ancient religions of Europe, noted that there were cults centered around the use of trees and pillars, often acting like idols. While in Macedonia he entered a temple/shrine that was maintained by Dervishes in the town of Tekekioii (possibly the tekke in modern Tetovo). He was permitted to take part in a ritual at the shrine, the focus of which was a large upright rectangular stone, possibly a "local" Kaaba. The stone was said to have fallen from heaven, and it was venerated or at least respected by Muslims and Christians in the region. It was stained black by years of being anointed with holy oils. A sick man was circumambulating the pillar, kissing and hugging it at each pass. In a ritual connected to it, a person prays before the stone, hugs it, draws water from a nearby spring, and climbs a small hill at the top of which is an Islamic "saint's grave". Growing over the grave is a thorn tree, which has rags and fabric hanging from it placed there by the sick seeking divine cures. The water is poured into a hole in the center of the grave, mixed with grave-dirt, and then the suppliant drinks this mixture three times, then anoints their head three times. Then a circumambulation around the grave is started, with three passes, each time kissing and touching with the forehead "the stone at the head and foot of it". Afterwards, grave dust was given to Evans, to be made up into a triangular amulet. The Dervish then cast some pebbles, read them (divination) as falling good, a priest sacrificed a ram outside the grave site, with the blood of the ram used to anoint the forehead of the suppliant. Finally, Evans was instructed to give something to attach to the pillar overnight, and he himself resides with the stone and his guide, lighting candles after sunset and eating the sacrificial ram.

Pre-Islamic influences 
In addition to schools of Islamic thought, the Bektashis in Turkey and the Balkans also maintain ancient practices from pre-Islamic societies. For instance, upon visiting the village of Haidar-es-Sultan and Hassan-dede in the summer of 1900, enthographer J.W. Crowfoot witnessed survivals of the ancient Hero Cult and the pythian oracle.

In Haidar-es-Sultan, an old Bektashi woman would inhale the sulfurous fumes of a special well in the center of the town, and go into an ecstasy in which she would divine a person's future, much like at the Oracle at Delphi. This well was also associated with a central tomb, which stood out from other local graves in the town because it wasn't neglected and it was given special care. At Hassan-dede there was also a central tomb, maintained by a family that stated that they were direct descendants of the occupant of the tomb, who had come from Korashan. These are elements that are strongly associated with the older pagan Hero Cults of that area.  For example, Mycenaean royalty were buried in tombs and worshipped for centuries later.  The Balkans and Anatolia also shared this common pattern of saint veneration, as shrines in Macedonia were used in both Muslim and Christian traditions.

Influences of the faith of the Baktāsh’īyyah and Qizilbāsh tāriqāt on the folk religion throughout Anatolia and the Balkans 

{{Tree chart|boxstyle=background:#A4F4F9;| | |!| |:| | |:| KIZ |~| BBK |~| HÜR |~| MUK |~| SİN |J| | | HUR | | |:| | | |!| |`| ZAH | | AKB | | | | | |KIZ=Sāfav’īyyah-Kızılbaş|GİA=Şîʿa-i Bâtın’îyye|HÜR=Khurrām’īyyah|SİN=Sunbādh’īyyah|BBK=Bābak’īyyah|MUK=Mukannaʿīyyah|HUR=Hurūf’īyyah<ref>Balcıoğlu, Tahir Harimî, Türk Tarihinde Mezhep Cereyanları – The course of madhhab events in Turkish history – Two crucial front in Anatolian Shiism: The fundamental Islamic theology of the Hurufiyya madhhab, (Preface and notes by Hilmi Ziya Ülken), Ahmet Sait Press, page 198, Kanaat Publications, Istanbul, 1940. </ref> Tariqa|AKB=Akbar’īyyah Sūfīsm|ZAH=Zāhed’īyyah Tariqa}}

{| class="navbox" style="float:center; margin: 2ex 0 0.6em 0.5em; width: 8em; line-height:111%;" 
!The schematic history of the development of the Imāmī-Bektāşīlik from other Shī‘ah Muslim sects 
|-   Shī‘ah Imāmī Alevī Bektāshī Ṭarīqah
|

Notes

Further reading

Alevi / Bektashi history
 Birge, John Kingsley (1937). The Bektashi order of dervishes, London and Hartford.
 Brown, John (1927), The Darvishes of Oriental Spiritualism. Küçük, Hülya (2002) The Roles of the Bektashis in Turkey’s National Struggle. Leiden: Brill.
 Mélikoff, Irène (1998). Hadji Bektach: Un mythe et ses avatars. Genèse et évolution du soufisme populaire en Turquie. Leiden: Islamic History and Civilization, Studies and Texts, volume 20, .
 Shankland, David (1994). “Social Change and Culture: Responses to Modernization in an Alevi Village in Anatolia.”In  C.N. Hann, ed., When History Accelerates: Essays on Rapid Social Change, Complexity, and Creativity.'' London: Athlone Press.
 Yaman, Ali (undated). "Kizilbash Alevi Dedes." (Based on his MA thesis for Istanbul University.)

Bibliographies
 Vorhoff, Karin. (1998), “Academic and Journalistic Publications on the Alevi and Bektashi of Turkey.” In: Tord Olsson/Elizabeth Özdalga/Catharina Raudvere (eds.) Alevi Identity: Cultural, Religious and Social Perspectives, Istanbul: Swedish Research Institute, pp. 23–50.

Islam in North Macedonia
Islam in Albania
Islam in Kosovo
Bektashi Order